Loena Hendrickx (born 5 November 1999) is a Belgian figure skater. She is the 2022 World silver medalist, the 2023 European silver medalist, the 2022–23 Grand Prix Final bronze medalist, the 2022 Grand Prix de France champion, a two-time Challenger series  gold medalist, a two-time International Challenge Cup champion (2017, 2021), and a five-time Belgian national champion (2017–2019, 2022–2023).

Hendrickx has finished within the top ten at three European Championships (2017, 2018, and 2022) and three World Championships (2018, 2021, and 2022). She represented Belgium at the 2018 and 2022 Winter Olympics, finishing sixteenth and eighth, respectively. The most successful Belgian women's skater in history, she is the first-ever World, European, and Grand Prix medalist from Belgium in that discipline.

Personal life 
Loena Hendrickx was born in Turnhout, Belgium. She is the younger sister of Belgian figure skater Jorik Hendrickx.

Career

Early years 
Hendrickx began learning to skate in 2004. She appeared internationally on the advanced novice level from December 2012 through December 2013 and then moved up to the junior ranks.

2014–2015 season: International junior debut 
Coached by Carine Herrygers in Turnhout, Hendrickx debuted on the ISU Junior Grand Prix series, finishing seventeenth in Dresden, Germany. She won her second junior national title and then placed sixteenth at the 2015 European Youth Olympic Festival. She closed her season with junior bronze medals at the International Challenge Cup and Coupe du Printemps.

2015–2016 season 
Competing in the 2015–16 ISU Junior Grand Prix series, Hendrickx placed fourteenth in Riga, Latvia, and then eleventh in Logroño, Spain. Her senior international debut came in October 2015 at the International Cup of Nice; she finished seventh at the event. She missed the second half of the season due to a spinal fracture and resumed skating after six months.

2016–2017 season: Worlds debut 
After the closure of Turnhout's ice rink, Hendrickx and her brother decided to train at a temporary rink. Although still age-eligible to compete on the junior level, she focused on senior events. Starting her season on the ISU Challenger Series, she placed seventh at both the 2016 CS Nebelhorn Trophy and 2016 CS Finlandia Trophy. In October 2016, she won her first senior international medal – silver at the International Cup of Nice. In November, she was awarded silver at the NRW Trophy and gold at the Belgian Championships. A lack of financial support led to her having to decline an invitation to an international event in Russia.

In January 2017, Hendrickx competed at her first ISU Championship – the European Championships in Ostrava, Czech Republic. She suffered from foot pain during the event but nevertheless placed eleventh in the short program and advanced to the free skate, in which she ranked seventh, resulting in a final placement of seventh.

In February 2017, Hendrickx won gold at the International Challenge Cup in The Hague, Netherlands. In March, she placed seventeenth in the short, fourteenth in the free, and fifteenth overall at the 2017 World Championships in Helsinki, Finland. Due to her result, Belgium qualified a spot in the ladies event at the 2018 Winter Olympics in Pyeongchang, South Korea. After this, she received some financial reimbursement from the Belgian figure skating federation for her expenses, having previously financed her career entirely by herself.

2017–2018 season: Pyeongchang Olympics 
A knee injury forced Hendrickx to withdraw from three events early in the season. She repeated as Belgian national champion in December. In January, she placed fifth at the 2018 European Championships in Moscow, Russia. The following month, she represented Belgium at the 2018 Winter Olympics, where she and her brother Jorik were the only siblings competing in the singles skating events. The journey to Pyeongchang, South Korea, was the longest Hendrickx had ever travelled before and the first time their mother had attended a major international event to watch them compete in person. She placed sixteenth overall.

At the 2018 World Championships in Milan, Italy, Hendrickx set new personal bests in both segments to finish in ninth place. Her result qualified Belgium to send two skaters to compete at the 2019 World Championships.

2018–2019 season: Challenger bronze, Grand Prix debut 
Hendrickx began her season at the 2018 CS Nebelhorn Trophy, winning the bronze medal, her first Challenger medal. She achieved her goal of landing a triple Lutz-triple toe loop combination cleanly in both her short and free programs.

Her placement at the 2018 World Championships qualified her for two assignments on the 2018-19 Grand Prix. Making her first visit to the United States for 2018 Skate America, Hendrickx scored 54.13 in the short program but withdrew before the free skate due to medical reasons.  She placed fifth at the 2018 Grand Prix of Helsinki, her second event.

Hendrickx withdrew from the European Championships due to a back injury but was ready to compete at the World Championships in Saitama, where she placed twelfth. She had decided to attend the World Championships only a week prior.

2019–2020 season: Multiple injuries 
In the summer of 2019, Hendrickx sprained and fractured her ankle and tore three ligaments while at a training camp in Turkey. She returned to the ice in September but sustained another ankle injury on a triple flip attempt, necessitating another month off the ice. In December, she injured her ankle a third time, forcing her to withdraw from the 2020 European Championships. At the end of January 2020, she had a tendon injury in her left ankle, keeping her off the ice until past when the onset of the COVID-19 pandemic closed rinks. Upon returning to the ice three months later, she remarked, "I was so happy, without pain, and the motivation was there again."

2020–2021 season: Comeback 
Hendrickx was slated to make her return to competition at the 2020 CS Nebelhorn Trophy. She was added to the roster after another skater's withdrawal but withdrew before the competition started. Hendrickx started her 2020-21 season at the inaugural CS Budapest Trophy, achieving a new personal best in the short program and winning the gold medal overall. She was scheduled to compete on the Grand Prix at the 2020 Internationaux de France, but the event was cancelled as a result of the COVID-19 pandemic.  She later won the International Challenge Cup for the second time in her career.  She stated afterwards that she was still managing her back pain and had refrained from certain moves in training for three months.

At the 2021 World Championships in Stockholm, Hendrickx placed tenth in the short program after falling on her triple flip. In the free skate, Hendrickx skated cleanly to score a new personal best of 141.16, placing fourth in that segment and fifth overall. Her free skate score was only 0.44 points behind that of Elizaveta Tuktamysheva's, who was third in that segment. Hendrickx's fifth-place ordinal qualified two placements for Belgium at the 2022 World Championships, and the possibility of a second spot at the 2022 Winter Olympic Games in Beijing. Looking ahead, she remarked: "an Olympic medal is a childhood dream, but let me stay injury-free first and foremost."

2021–2022 season: Beijing Olympics and World silver 
In the pre-season, Hendrickx spent time training with famed Russian coach Alexei Mishin. In August, she announced that she was parting ways with longtime coach Carine Herrygers and would subsequently be coached solely by her brother Jorik and choreographer Adam Solya. Beginning her season at the 2021 CS Finlandia Trophy, she placed fourth.

Hendrickx's first Grand Prix assignment was initially the 2021 Cup of China, but following its cancellation, she was reassigned to the 2021 Gran Premio d'Italia in Turin. On her birthday, Hendrickx unexpectedly placed first in the short program with a new personal best of 73.52, following an error by pre-event favourite and World champion Anna Shcherbakova. She was third in the free skate and dropped behind Shcherbakova and Maiia Khromykh to take the bronze medal. This was both her first Grand Prix medal and the first ever for a Belgian woman, which she described as "a dream come true." In the interval between international events, Hendrickx won the Belgian senior national title for the fourth time. She then placed fifth at the 2021 Rostelecom Cup. In the free skate, she attempted a triple loop, which she said had "always been a challenge for me. Last week, it was pretty consistent, so we tried it today." 

Hendrickx attended her first European Championships in four years in Tallinn and placed second in the short program with a clean skate, winning a silver medal. She struggled in the free skate, falling twice and placing fifth in that segment, dropping her to fourth place. She said afterwards that given the strength of the Russian skaters in the free, she had not expected to medal, but that "I would be happier being fourth with a better free program."

Named to her second Belgian Olympic team, Hendrickx served as Belgium's co-flagbearer during the opening ceremonies, alongside alpine skier Armand Marchant. Hendrickx began the 2022 Winter Olympics women's event placing seventh in the short program. She put a hand down on her double Axel and fought for other jump landings, admitting after, "I think I had a little adrenaline, and 70 points is still okay." Ninth in the free skate, she finished eighth overall.

The Belgian skating federation initially forgot to submit Hendrickx's name to compete at the 2022 World Championships, but upon publication of the entry list, they were able to correct this via appeal to ISU president Jan Dijkema. Due to Vladimir Putin's invasion of Ukraine days after the Olympics concluded, all Russian and Belarusian athletes were banned from participating at the World Championships. With the Russian women who had dominated the sport for most of the preceding eight years absent, Hendrickx was perceived as a major podium contender. She tore a groin muscle three weeks before the championships and was unable to train before the competition began. Despite a rough landing on her combination, Hendrickx finished second in the short program, winning a silver small medal. With 75.00 points, she was 5.32 points behind segment leader Kaori Sakamoto and 2.45 points ahead of third-place Mariah Bell. In the free skate, Hendrickx underrotated two triple jumps, but placed second in that segment as well to take the silver medal. She became the first Belgian woman to win a World Championship medal and the first Belgian figure skater to do so in any discipline since the pair team Lannoy/Baugniet in 1948. Reflecting on her struggle with injury, Hendrickx said, "I'm proud I didn’t give up despite my injury, but I think today was a limit, and now my body needs a rest."

2022–2023 season: European silver, Grand Prix Final bronze 
For Hendrickx's short program for the new season, regular choreographer Adam Solya created a Latin-themed medley of "Sí, Mamá" and "Mi Gente." She said that "in the beginning, I was afraid because I didn't know if it would suit me. I really need to use my body and my hips, and I am not really a dance person. But after I watched a video of it with all the details, with the dress and the makeup, I was pleased."

Hendrickx was assigned to the 2022 CS Nebelhorn Trophy to start the season, entering as the pre-event favourite. She won the gold medal by almost fifteen points, though narrowly finishing second in the free skate behind silver medalist Wi Seo-yeong. She was then invited to be part of Team Europe at the Japan Open. She finished second in the women's free skate competition, behind Japan's Kaori Sakamoto, with a score of 132.53. Team Europe finished third overall.

After being disappointed by the free skate scores at her first two events, Hendrickx and her choreographer, Adam Solya, made changes to program music and choreography. Hendrickx then competed at the 2022 Grand Prix de France Grand Prix event, where she won both the short program and free skate, the latter taking place on her 23rd birthday. Her gold medal was her first ISU Grand Prix gold medal and the first ISU Grand Prix gold medal for a Belgian skater in any discipline. She was presented with a birthday cake in the Kiss and cry after the free skate by French skater Maé-Bérénice Méité. Two weeks later, she won her fifth Belgian national title. She debuted another revision to her free skate, discarding Fachinetti's "Poeta" in favour of additional original music by Karl Hugo. Hendrickx said that the changes were made because she "wanted to expand the artistry of the program, the accents and the nuances," adding that it was "really unique that this music has been especially made for me." Hendrickx also fell ill at the time of the event, later saying, "my blood results were not very good, so I had to take a little bit of rest." Her second event, the 2022 Grand Prix of Espoo, was widely seen as a contest between her and 2022 MK John Wilson Trophy champion Mai Mihara of Japan. Hendrickx won the short program, finishing 1.30 points ahead of Mihara. Both she and Mihara struggled in the free skate segment, in which Hendrickx was third and finished second overall, with Mihara taking the gold. She said of her own performance, "I know I can do much better, but we are all human, and it happens."

Hendrickx's Grand Prix results qualified her for the Grand Prix Final in Turin, which she entered as one of the medal favourites, in particular opposite both Mihara and reigning World champion Kaori Sakamoto. She finished third in the short program, behind Sakamoto and Mihara, after both parts of her jump combination were deemed slightly underrotated. She struggled more in the free skate, making several jump errors, but with the competition as a whole being "turbulent" and with many skaters underperforming, she remained in third place overall and won the bronze medal. This was another figure skating milestone for Belgium. She said afterwards that she was "shocked too about the results today, and also, I'm really disappointed about my skate today. It wasn't so good, I know I can do better. I'm happy am still in the third place."

Entering the 2023 European Championships as the favourite for the gold medal, Hendrickx underrotated her triple Lutz and managed only a double toe loop as the second part of her jump combination, placing second in that segment behind Georgian Anastasiia Gubanova. She said that "this season I showed some very good short programs. Here it just didn't work out. I think I will cry in the hotel and then I will have a fresh start tomorrow." Hendrickx fell twice in the free skate, placing third in that segment, but remaining second overall by a margin of 0.97 points over Swiss bronze medalist Kimmy Repond. This was the first European Championship medal for a Belgian woman. She said that she had "made history for Belgium and my very first European medal. I should be proud but as a professional athlete I can’t be satisfied with what I showed."

Programs

Competitive highlights 
GP: Grand Prix; CS: Challenger Series; JGP: Junior Grand Prix

Detailed results 
Small medals for short and free programs awarded only at ISU Championships.

Senior results

Junior results

References

External links 
 
 
 
 
 
 
 

1999 births
Living people
Belgian female single skaters
Sportspeople from Turnhout
Figure skaters at the 2018 Winter Olympics
Figure skaters at the 2022 Winter Olympics
Olympic figure skaters of Belgium
World Figure Skating Championships medalists
21st-century Belgian women